Riders of the Dusk is a 1949 American Western film directed by Lambert Hillyer and written by Adele Buffington and Robert Emmett Tansey. The film stars Whip Wilson, Andy Clyde, Reno Browne, Tris Coffin, Marshall Reed and Myron Healey. The film was released on November 13, 1949, by Monogram Pictures.

Plot

Cast              
Whip Wilson as Whip Wilson
Andy Clyde as Winks Holliday
Reno Browne as Nora Neal
Tris Coffin as J.J. Hall
Marshall Reed as Brad Bradshaw
Myron Healey as Sheriff Jim Scott
John Merton as Art 
Mike Ragan as Gus 
Lee Roberts as Danny
Dee Cooper as Tom 
Thornton Edwards as Deputy Ed

References

External links
 

1949 films
American Western (genre) films
1949 Western (genre) films
Monogram Pictures films
Films directed by Lambert Hillyer
American black-and-white films
1940s English-language films
1940s American films